Paula Badosa defeated Barbora Krejčíková in the final, 6–3, 4–6, 7–6(7–4) to win the women's singles tennis title at the 2022 Sydney Tennis Classic. Krejčíková reached the final after having saved seven match points in her semifinal match against Anett Kontaveit.

Petra Kvitová was the defending champion after winning the previous tournament in 2019, but she lost to Ons Jabeur in the second round.

Seeds 
The top two seeds received a bye into the second round.

Draw

Finals

Top half

Bottom half

Qualifying

Seeds

Qualifiers

Lucky losers

Draw

First qualifier

Second qualifier

Third qualifier

Fourth qualifier

Fifth qualifier

Sixth qualifier

References

External links
 Qualifying & Main draw

2022 Sydney Tennis Classic
Sydney Tennis Classic
Sydney